The 3rd Armoured Division is a unit of the French Army. The Division is the heir of the 3rd Algerian Infantry Division (3e DIA) formed in 1943 and dissolved in 1946, which contributed in the liberation of Marseille during the Second World War. 

The 3rd Armoured Division was created in 1951 then dissolved in 1991. The 3rd Mechanised Brigade (3e BM), created in 1999, inherited the traditions of the division.

The 3rd Division (3e DIV) was recreated on June 20, 2016 as part of a reorganisation of the French Army.

Creation and different nominations 

 The 3rd Algerian Infantry Division (3e DIA) was created on April 15, 1943;
 Dissolution on April 15, 1946;
 The 3rd Armored Division (3e DB), heir of the 3rd Algerian Infantry Division, was created in 1951;
 The 3rd Armored Division was dissolved on July 1991;
 The 3rd Mechanised Brigade (3e BM), created on July 1999 inherited traditions of the division. The brigade became designated as 3rd Light Armored Brigade (3e BLB) in 2014;
 The 3rd Division was recreated on June 20, 2016 part of the Scorpion Force alongside the 1st Division.

Heraldry 

It was under the signs of Latin traditions that général de Monsabert wanted to place the 3rd Algerian Infantry Division 3e DIA during creation on May 1, 1943.

The insignia of "Victory" of Cirta (province of Numidia, today Constantine (provence in Algeria)) is supported by three crescents representing the Muslims, which composed the majority of the division, Allied to the metropolitans (blue white red).Origin of the insignia, La Victoire de Cirta

The "Victory" was a Roman goddess protector of the Emperors that the Legio III Augusta de Cirta particularly venerated. The winged statuette was found during a search of an old garrison in Constantine in the 19th century.

The motto of the 3rd Light Armoured Brigade was  : « Plus d'honneur que d'honneurs » in French which translates literally to « More honor than the honors ». The motto of the 3rd Division currently is : « Un seul but : La victoire », which translates to «One goal, Victory».

History

1943 to 1946 

The 3rd Algerian Infantry Division (3e DIA), formed on April 15, 1943, fought in the Italy and France during World War II under general Joseph de Goislard de Monsabert and Augustin Guillaume. The division was dissolved on April 15, 1946.

1951 to 1991 

The 3rd Division was reconstituted in 1951 at the corps of the French Forces in Germany. This was a grand unit of almost 15000 men covering the Western part of Germany and comprising three brigades:
 The 5th Mechanised Brigade at Tübingen;
 The 12th Mechanised Brigade at Offenbourg;
 The 13th Motoryzed Brigade at Konstanz

the division became the 3rd Armoured Division in 1978. Three infantry regiments, two tank regiments, two artillery regiments, one engineer regiment, and one command and support regiment. During the transformation of the FFA into FFECSA (French Forces and Civilian Element), the division was redimensioned and dissolved in 1991.

Organigram in 1991 

Two tank regiments, three infantry regiments, two artillery regiments, one engineer regiment, one command and support regiment:

Based in Fribourg-en-Brisgau.

 3rd Dragoon Regiment 
 12th Cuirassiers Regiment
 19th Group Mounted Chasseurs 
 42nd Infantry Regiment 
 152nd Infantry Regiment

Support:

 11th Artillery Regiment
 34th Artillery Regiment
 11th Engineer Regiment

Other support :
 3rd Command and Support Regiment

1999 to 2015 

The 3rd Mechanised Brigade (3e BM) created in 1999 retook traditions. The headquarter staff was based in Limoges. In 2011, the headquarter staff of the 3e BM garrisoned at Clermont-Ferrand.

On March 18, 2014, the 3rd Mechanised Brigade became designated as the 3rd Light Armoured Brigade (3e BLB).

Since 2016 

The 3rd Division (3e DIV) was recreated during a ceremony on June 20, 2016. Interarm, the division is formed of three brigades part of the Scorpion Force alongside the 1st Division, units stationed in outre-mer and overseas. Headquarter staff is garrisoned in Marseille.

Composition 

The 3rd Division is based in Marseille and is subordinated to the Commandement des Forces Terrestres (CFT). Effectifs form 25000 men and 4000 reservists in:

 2 Régiment de Dragons (2 RD) - 2nd Dragoon Regiment (CBRN-defense Regiment), in Fontevraud-l'Abbaye
 31 Régiment du Génie (31 RG) - 31st Engineer Regiment, in Castelsarrasin
 54 Régiment d'Artillerie (54 RA) - 54th Artillery Regiment (Mistral missiles),  in Hyères

 2 Brigade Blindée (2 BB) – 2nd Armored Brigade, in Illkirch-Graffenstaden
 2 Compagnie de Commandement et de Transmissions (2 CCT) - 2nd Command and Signals Company (VAB), in Illkirch-Graffenstaden
 12 Régiment de Cuirassiers (12 RC) - 12th Cuirassier Regiment (Leclerc MBTs, VBL vehicles), in Olivet
 501e Régiment de Chars de Combat (501 RCC) - 501st Tank Regiment (Leclerc MBTs, VAB, VBL vehicles), in Mourmelon-le-Grand
 Régiment de Marche du Tchad (RMT) - Régiment de marche du Tchad (VBCI IFVs), in Meyenheim
 16 Bataillon de Chasseurs à pied (16 BCP) - 16th Chasseurs on Foot Battalion (VBCI IFVs), in Bitche
 92 Régiment d'Infanterie (92 RI) - 92nd Infantry Regiment (VBCI IFVs), in Clermont-Ferrand
 40 Régiment d'Artillerie (40 RA) - 40th Artillery Regiment (AMX AuF1 howitzers (to be replaced by Caesar 8x8), CAESAR howitzers, RTF1 mortars, Mistral missiles), in Suippes 
 13 Régiment du Génie (13 RG) - 13th Engineer Regiment (VAB Génie), in Valdahon
 Centre de Formation Initiale des Militaires du rang de la 2e Brigade Blindée / 12e Régiment de Chasseurs d'Afrique (CFIM 2e BB - 12e RCA) - 2nd Armored Brigade Troops Initial Formation Centre / 12th African Chasseurs Regiment, in Bitche
 6 Brigade Légère Blindée (6e BLB) – 6th Light Armored Brigade, in Nîmes
 6 Compagnie de Commandement et de Transmissions (6 CCT) - 6th Command and Signals Company (VAB), in Nîmes
 1 Régiment de Spahis (1er RS) – 1st Spahi Regiment (AMX-10 RC, VAB, VBL vehicles), in Valence with AMX 10 RC
 1 Régiment Étranger de Cavalerie (1 REC) - 1st Foreign Cavalry Regiment (AMX-10 RC, VAB, VBL vehicles), in Marseille
 2 Régiment Étranger d'Infanterie (2 REI) - 2nd Foreign Infantry Regiment (VBCI IFVs), in Nîmes
 13 Demi Brigade de Légion Etrangère (13 DBLE) - 13th Demi-Brigade of the Foreign Legion (VAB vehicles, to be replaced by VBMR Griffon), in La Cavalerie
 21 Régiment d'Infanterie de Marine (21 RIMa) - 21st Marine Infantry Regiment (VAB vehicles, to be replaced by VBMR Griffon), in Fréjus
 3 Régiment d'Artillerie de Marine (3 RAMa) - 3rd Marine Artillery Regiment (CAESAR and TRF1 howitzers, RTF1 mortars, Mistral missiles), in Canjuers
 1 Régiment Étranger de Génie (1 REG) - 1st Foreign Engineer Regiment, in Laudun
 Centre de Formation Initiale des Militaires du rang 6 Brigade Légère Blindée / 4e Régiment d'Infanterie de Marine (CFIM 6e BLB - 4e RIMa) - 6th Light Armored Brigade Troops Initial Formation Centre / 4th Marine Infantry Regiment, in Fréjus

 11 Brigade Parachutiste (11e BP) – 11th Parachute Brigade, in Balma
 11 Compagnie de Commandement et de Transmissions Parachutiste (11 CCTP) - 11th Parachute Command and Signals Company, in Balma
 1 Régiment de Hussards Parachutistes (1 RHP) - 1st Parachute Hussar Regiment (AMX-10 RC, ERC 90, VAB, VBL vehicles), in Tarbes
 1 Régiment de Chasseurs Parachutistes (1 RCP) - 1st Parachute Chasseur Regiment (VAB), in Pamiers
 2 Régiment Étranger de Parachutistes (2 REP) - 2nd Foreign Parachute Regiment (VAB), in Calvi
 3 Régiment de Parachutistes d'Infanterie de Marine (3 RPIMa) - 3rd Marine Infantry Parachute Regiment (VAB), in Carcassonne
 8 Régiment de Parachutistes d'Infanterie de Marine (8 RPIMa) - 8th Marine Infantry Parachute Regiment (VAB), in Castres
 35 Régiment d'Artillerie Parachutiste (35 RAP) - 35th Parachute Artillery Regiment (CAESAR howitzers, RTF1 mortars, Mistral missiles), in Tarbes
 17 Régiment du Génie Parachutiste (17 RGP) - 17th Parachute Engineer Regiment, in Montauban
 1 Régiment du Train Parachutiste (1 RTP) - 1st Parachute Supply Regiment, in Toulouse
 École des Troupes Aéroportées (ETAP) - Airborne Troops School, in Pau
 Centre de Formation Initiale des Militaires du rang 11 Brigade Parachutiste / 6e Régiment de Parachutistes d'Infanterie de Marine (CFIM 11e BP - 6e RPIMa) - 11th Parachute Brigade Troops Initial Formation Centre / 6th Marine Infantry Parachute Regiment, in Caylus

Notes

References
David Isby and Charles Kamps Jr., Armies of NATO's Central Front, Jane's Publishing Company, 1985. 
Ian Sumner and Charles Vauvillier, The French Army 1939-45 (2), Osprey, 1998. 

Armored Division, 3rd
Armored divisions of France
Military units and formations established in 1943
Military units and formations disestablished in 1991
Military units and formations established in 2016